Absent Friends may refer to:

 "To absent friends", a traditional toast
 Absent Friends (band), an Australian band
 Absent Friends (album) or the title song, by the Divine Comedy, 2004
 Absent Friends (play), by Alan Ayckbourn, 1974
 "Absent Friends" (Bugs), a television episode
 "Absent Friends" (Dad's Army), a television episode
 Absent Friends, a 2004 novel by S. J. Rozan

See also
 "Absent Friend", the Swedish entry in the Eurovision Song Contest 1965